The molecular formula C15H20N2 (molar mass: 228.33 g/mol, exact mass: 228.1626 u) may refer to:

 Indalpine
 SDZ SER-082

Molecular formulas